Kleine Isar is a river of Bavaria, Germany. It is a branch of the Isar in Munich.

See also
List of rivers of Bavaria

References 

Rivers of Bavaria
0Kleine Isar
Rivers of Germany